Judith Diana McCarthy (born 15 July 1937) is a New Zealand former cricketer who played as a right-handed batter. She appeared in 11 Test matches and 5 One Day Internationals for New Zealand between 1966 and 1975. In Test cricket, she scored five half-centuries and one century, 103 against England. She played domestic cricket for Auckland and North Shore.

References

External links
 
 

1937 births
Living people
Sportspeople from Whakatāne
New Zealand women cricketers
New Zealand women Test cricketers
New Zealand women One Day International cricketers
Auckland Hearts cricketers
North Shore women cricketers